The dorsal trigeminal tract, dorsal trigeminothalamic tract, or posterior trigeminothalamic tract, is composed of second-order neuronal axons. These fibers carry sensory information about discriminative touch and conscious proprioception in the oral cavity from the principal (chief sensory) nucleus of the trigeminal nerve to the ventral posteromedial (VPM) nucleus of the thalamus.

The dorsal trigeminothalamic tract is also called the posterior trigeminal lemniscus.

Pathway 
The first-order neurons (from the trigeminal ganglion) enter the pons and synapse on second-order neurons in the principal (chief sensory) nucleus. Axons of the second-order neurons then decussate to enter the trigeminal lemniscus in the midbrain and then ascend to the ventral posteromedial nucleus of the contralateral thalamus, forming the ventral trigeminothalamic tract. A subset of these fibers do not decussate and travel to the ipsilateral ventral posteromedial nucleus of the thalamus. These non-decussating fibers give rise to the dorsal trigeminothalamic tract. The third order neurons in the thalamus ascend to the sensory cortex of the postcentral gyrus.

See also
 Ventral trigeminal tract

References

Sources 
 Siegel, A., & Sapru, H. N. (2006). Essential neuroscience. Lippincott Williams & Wilkins.
 Norton, N. S. (2016). Netter's head and neck anatomy for dentistry. Elsevier Health Sciences.
 Henssen D. J. H. A. (2016) "New Insights in Trigeminal Anatomy: A Double Orofacial Tract for Nociceptive Input" Frontiers in Neuroanatomy.

External links 
 Trigeminothalamic tracts (Netter image)
 http://www.medilexicon.com/medicaldictionary.php?t=48738

Trigeminal nerve
Thalamic connections